Antigen KI-67, also known as Ki-67, Ki-67 or MKI67 (Marker Of Proliferation Ki-67), is a protein that in humans is encoded by the MKI67 gene (antigen identified by monoclonal antibody Ki-67).

Function 
Antigen KI-67 is a nuclear protein that is associated with cellular proliferation. Altering Ki-67 expression levels did not significantly affect cell proliferation in vivo. Ki-67 mutant mice developed normally and cells lacking Ki-67 proliferated efficiently. Furthermore, it is associated with ribosomal RNA transcription.  Inactivation of antigen KI-67  leads to inhibition of ribosomal RNA synthesis.

Use as a marker of proliferating cells

The Ki-67 protein (also known as MKI67) is a cellular marker for proliferation, and can be used in immunohistochemistry. It is strictly associated with cell proliferation. During interphase, the Ki-67 antigen can be exclusively detected within the cell nucleus, whereas in mitosis most of the protein is relocated to the surface of the chromosomes. Ki-67 protein is present during all active phases of the cell cycle (G1, S, G2, and mitosis), but is absent in resting (quiescent) cells (G0). Cellular content of Ki-67 protein markedly increases during cell progression through S phase of the cell cycle. In breast cancer Ki67 identifies a high proliferative subset of patients with ER-positive breast cancer who derive greater benefit from adjuvant chemotherapy

Antibody labeling 
Ki-67 is an excellent marker to determine the growth fraction of a given cell population. The fraction of Ki-67-positive tumor cells (the Ki-67 labeling index) is often correlated with the clinical course of cancer. The best-studied examples in this context are prostate, brain and breast carcinomas, as well as nephroblastoma and neuroendocrine tumors. For these types of tumors, the prognostic value for survival and tumor recurrence have repeatedly been proven in uni- and multivariate analysis.

MIB-1 
Ki-67 and MIB-1 monoclonal antibodies are directed against different epitopes of the same proliferation-related antigen. Ki-67 and MIB-1 may be used on fixed sections. MIB-1 is used in clinical applications to determine the Ki-67 labelling index. One of its primary advantages over the original Ki-67 antibody (and the reason why it has essentially supplanted the original antibody for clinical use) is that it can be used on formalin-fixed paraffin-embedded sections, after heat-mediated antigen retrieval (see next section below).

Original Ki-67 antibody 
The Ki-67 protein was originally defined by the prototype monoclonal antibody Ki-67, which was generated by immunizing mice with nuclei of the Hodgkin lymphoma cell line L428. The name is derived from the city of origin (Kiel, Germany) and the number of the original clone in the 96-well plate.

Interactions 
Ki-67 (protein) has been shown to interact with CBX3.

See also
PCNA - Proliferating Cell Nuclear Antigen, expressed during the DNA synthesis.

Additional images

References

External links

http://www.pathologyoutlines.com/topic/stainski67.html

Cell biology
Proteins
Cell cycle